Abacetus sulculatus is a species of ground beetle in the subfamily Pterostichinae. It was described by Henry Walter Bates in 1892. It is found in Burma.

References

sulculatus
Beetles described in 1892